Horst Faber (born 9 November 1921) is a German former figure skater who competed in men's singles. He represented the SC Riessersee and was a nine-time German champion. His biggest accomplishment was winning the silver medal at the 1951 European Championships.

Faber married fellow skater Eva Prawitz, and together they won the ice dancing championship at the 1950 German Nationals. Faber turned 100 in November 2021.

Results

References

skatabase

1921 births
Living people
European Figure Skating Championships medalists
German male ice dancers
German male single skaters
World Figure Skating Championships medalists